Ruggles Beach is an unincorporated community in Erie County, in the U.S. state of Ohio.

The community derives its name from Almon Ruggles, a government surveyor.

References

Unincorporated communities in Erie County, Ohio
Unincorporated communities in Ohio